Marc Handelman (born Santa Clara, California, 1975) is an American painter living and working in Brooklyn, New York. He studied at the Rhode Island School of Design (RISD) earning a BFA in Painting in 1998, with an Art History concentration. He spent two of those years at RISD at the European Honors Program, studying in Rome.  In 2003, he was awarded an  MFA in Visual Arts from Columbia University.

He is known for large scale paintings, landscapes and abstract images. Handelman's work has been shown internationally and has been featured in the USA Today exhibition at the Royal Academy in London. He has participated in exhibitions at several prominent commercial galleries such as Lombard-Freid Fine Arts, Elizabeth Dee Gallery in New York, and Marc Selwyn Fine Art in Los Angeles. He is represented by Sikkema Jenkins & Co. in New York.

External links
Sikkema Jenkins & Co. website
Marc Handelman - Paintings - Saatchi Gallery
Press links

1975 births
Living people
People from Santa Clara, California
20th-century American painters
American male painters
21st-century American painters
21st-century American male artists
Columbia University School of the Arts alumni
Rhode Island School of Design alumni
20th-century American male artists